David Petruschin (born April 8, 1979), best known as Raven, is an American drag queen, iconic make-up artist, and reality television personality from Riverside, California. Raven was a fixture in the Southern California nightclub scene before gaining international prominence for appearing in both the second season of RuPaul's Drag Race and the first season of All Stars. Raven placed as the runner-up on both seasons. He also served as a "professor" during all three seasons of RuPaul's Drag U. Petruschin has been RuPaul's makeup artist since Drag Race's ninth season (episode 3) and has since become a creative producer of both RuPaul’s Drag Race and RuPaul’s Drag Race All Stars. For his make-up work on the show, Petruschin received the Primetime Emmy Award for Outstanding Makeup for a Multi-Camera Series or Special (Non-Prosthetic) in 2020.

Early life
Petruschin was born to DeShawna and Viktor Petruschin in Idaho as the first of three children. Being of Russian ancestry, his mother, who separated from his father when Petruschin was seven years old, raised him a Mormon.

Career
At the beginning of his career, Petruschin worked as a cosmetics salesperson and a freelance make-up artist for local theater productions during the day, and at night performed in nightclubs as a go-go boy under the name "Phoenix". He started performing in drag in 2002, changing his moniker to Raven. He recalls the exact date to be the tenth of May, where he and Mayhem Miller (another Drag Race alumnus) performed for the very first time. Unlike many other drag queens, Petruschin learned drag without a drag mother to act as a mentor. As Raven, Petruschin auditioned to compete on the first and second seasons of RuPaul's Drag Race.

Drag Race franchise and makeup artistry
In 2010, it was announced that Raven would be a contestant on the second season of RuPaul's Drag Race. In the first episode, she won the season's first mini-challenge, a photo shoot. In the second and third episode she landed in the bottom two, having to "lip-sync for her life" twice in order to stay in the competition. She won both lip-syncs. Raven won a second mini-challenge in the fourth episode by guessing the price of various objects, earning her a phone call home; and a third mini-challenge in the fifth episode by successfully decorating a box to reflect his personal style. She won the seventh and eighth main challenges, which involved creating and promoting an autobiography, and giving an older gentleman a makeover, respectively. At the end of the competition, she ultimately placed second behind Tyra Sanchez.

Raven was one of many Drag Race alumni who were invited to act as a drag professor in the spin-off series RuPaul's Drag U, which has screened three seasons. Raven serves as a "drag professor" and mentor to female contestants who are given make-overs. In the series, his persona is not portrayed in a villainous fashion, but instead as a softer and nurturing mentor. Raven made a total of twelve appearances and collected the most wins during the series' run, being dubbed the "Makeover Queen". In an episode of the second season he gave his mother Deshawna a makeover, helping him win against the sisters of Jujubee and Manila Luzon.

On August 6, 2012, it was announced that Raven was one of twelve past Drag Race contestants selected to join the cast of RuPaul's Drag Race: All Stars that premiered on the Logo network on October 22, 2012. Prior to the airing of the season finale, Raven (along with All Stars contestants Manila Luzon, Latrice Royale, and Tammie Brown) appeared in a television commercial for travel website Orbitz's new portal for LGBT leisure travel. He was paired with contestant and best friend Jujubee to form Team Rujubee. They won the mini-challenges in the second and fifth episode by correctly answering questions about each other in the style of The Newlywed Game and by scoring more points in a game of basketball, which won them a call to their loved ones. The duo managed to make it to the finals, which aired on November 26, 2012, where Raven again landed as a runner-up, this time to winner Chad Michaels.

Petruschin returned to Drag Race as RuPaul's make-up artist for the ninth season, episode 3. He eventually received a nomination for the 2018 Make-Up Artists and Hair Stylists Guild Award in the category "Television and New Media Series: Best Contemporary Makeup". For his work on the tenth season, he received a nomination for the 70th Primetime Emmy Awards in the category Outstanding Makeup for a Multi-Camera Series or Special. He won an Emmy for his work on the twelfth season. Aside from doing RuPaul's make-up since 2017, he has served as a creative producer for All Stars since its third season and for Drag Race since its tenth.

Other appearances

Featured in a commercial promoting the syndication run of the cable television series Nip/Tuck on the Logo network, Raven lip synced to the theme song "A Perfect Lie" as he caresses a syringe close to his lips. The commercial is based on one of his past drag performances. He also has made a guest appearance in an episode of Logo's reality series, Pretty Hurts, which documents the life and career of celebrity medical aesthetician Rand Rusher. Raven was also featured on an episode of America's Next Top Model, Cycle 8, in which he participated in a photo shoot with each of the show's contestants in male drag and paired with a drag queen. Raven made a cameo in the 2011 music video for "Diamond Crowned Queen" by RuPaul's Drag Race season three winner Raja. His cameo was praised by critics, who named him the "magnificent Raven". In 2012, along with other RuPaul's Drag Race contestants, he appeared in another music video, "Queen" by Mimi Imfurst's band Xelle. He also starred in the music video "Feed Me Diamonds" by MNDR.

In 2014, Raven and Raja started a weekly YouTube fashion critique show on World of Wonder's channel called "RuPaul's Drag Race Fashion Photo RuView", where they discuss fashion from mostly Drag Race alumni. He has appeared on multiple other WOW shows as well. As Raven has become busy with the Drag Race franchise, spotting a Raven performance has become rare.

Legacy
In 2016, Raven was included as an inspiration in Vanity Fair's "100 Years of Drag Fashion" video, alongside iconic drag performers Divine, David Bowie, and RuPaul. The video presented his style as the epitome of 2000s-era drag. Raven is widely cited as creating the “face of drag”, even inspiring RuPaul’s original make-up artist, Mathu Andersen. RuPaul's Drag Race season six winner Bianca Del Rio has also stated that many young drag queens use Raven's style.

Filmography

Film
 The Bitch Who Stole Christmas (2021) as Shopping Lady

Television

Web

Music videos

Awards and nominations

|-
! scope="row"| 2018
| Make-Up Artists and Hair Stylists Guild Awards
| Best Contemporary Makeup in Television and New Media Series
| RuPaul's Drag Race
| 
| 
|-
! scope="row" | 2018
|rowspan="3"| Primetime Emmy Awards
| Outstanding Makeup for a Multi-Camera Series or Special
| RuPaul's Drag Race (season 10)
| 
|rowspan="2"| 
|-
! scope="row" | 2020
| rowspan="2"| Outstanding Contemporary Makeup for a Variety, Nonfiction or Reality Program
| RuPaul's Drag Race (season 12)
| 
|-
! scope="row" | 2021
| RuPaul's Drag Race (season 13)
| 
| 
|-
! scope="row"| 2022
| Make-Up Artists and Hair Stylists Guild Awards
| Best Contemporary Makeup in Television and New Media Series
| RuPaul's Drag Race
| 
|

References

External links
Make Up Work! with Raven series

1979 births
Living people
American drag queens
American people of Russian descent
Former Latter Day Saints
LGBT Latter Day Saints
LGBT people from California
American make-up artists
People from Riverside, California
People from Victorville, California
Primetime Emmy Award winners
RuPaul's Drag Race contestants
Raven
Painted with Raven